Steve's Prince of Steaks is a cheesesteak eatery that was founded in 1980 on Bustleton Ave in the Oxford Circle section of Northeast Philadelphia. The eatery has since expanded to three additional locations and is popular among locals. The eatery is known for its melted American cheese and does not chop the meat.

History
Steve's Prince of Steaks was established in 1980 by Steven Iliescu.

In 2013, Steve's expanded to Center City, Philadelphia.

Ratings
The eatery is a popular favorite among Philadelphia residents and has received mostly positive reviews from food critics. Philadelphia Magazine awarded Steve's Prince of Steaks best cheesesteak in Philadelphia in 1992 and 2007. Liz Clayton of Serious Eats described the Steve's cheesesteaks as "a relationship that works". Philadelphia Magazine food critic Arthur Etchells, on the other hand, described the cheesesteak at the Center City location to be "nearly flat" and "overcooked".

Los Angeles Dodgers pitcher David Price tweeted that the cheesesteak eatery "changed his life".

See also
 List of submarine sandwich restaurants

References

External links
 

Submarine sandwich restaurants
Restaurants in Philadelphia
1980 establishments in Pennsylvania
Restaurants established in 1980
Northeast Philadelphia